Wong Chin Foo (1847–1898) was a Chinese American activist, journalist, lecturer, and one of the most prolific Chinese writers in the San Francisco press of the 19th century. Wong, born in Jimo, Shandong Province, China, was among the first Chinese immigrants to be naturalized in 1873. Wong was dedicated to fighting for the equal rights of Chinese-Americans at the time of the Chinese Exclusion Act. Nowadays, Chinese-Americans consider Wong to be of similar character as Dr. Martin Luther King or Gandhi because of Wong's tremendous efforts and huge sacrifices to defend Chinese-Americans' rights in that difficult time.

Biography

Wong was born in 1847 to a well off family which soon lost its money during the Taiping Rebellion. In 1861, he was taken in by a missionary couple, and was baptized into the Baptist faith and came to the United States in 1867. In the following years he studied at Columbian College in Washington, D.C. and University at Lewisburg (later renamed Bucknell University) in Lewisburg, Pennsylvania in 1869–70, and left without finishing a degree.

Wong returned to China in 1870, after he studied and traveled in a number of American cities. "He personally thought he would never see America again. If he did, he was very much mistaken." In 1871, Wong married Liu Yu San who was a student at Eliza Jewett Hartwell's mission school in Dengzhou. Wong took a new name Wong Yen Ping. Wong worked for a short time in the Imperial Maritime Customs Service in Shanghai. He was dismissed and went to Zhenjiang where he found a job as an interpreter in Customs House. While he was working in China, Wong was excommunicated from the Shanghai Baptist Church.

In his spare time, he advocated to set up a civic improvement organization for spiritual and moral uplift, also for social and economic changes as well as for political reform. He advocated to experience and absorb western culture. Meantime, Wong contributed a lot of effort for prohibition of opium. Wong was also involved in subversive, anti-government activity. One of activities was known as the Zhenjiang Incident. Using his position in the Customs House, Wong organized the importation of foreigners and weapons. Wong claimed that he had planned the "Overthrow of this corrupt Chinese government". His anti-government activities finally got the Qing government's attention which put a reward on his head. Wong fled China leaving his wife and child behind.

He then moved to Japan and (in 1873) back to the U.S. where he became a citizen in 1874.  In the U.S., he lived mostly in the East and Midwest, traveling and lecturing. During this time anti-Chinese sentiment was rampant. Wong represented Chinese culture and promoted Chinese cuisine.   He defended the Chinese community against charges of godlessness, depravity, and debauchery.

Wong organized the Chinese community for political and civil rights, he organized the first association of Chinese American voters and also established the Chinese Equal Right League which united the Chinese Americans to fight against the Chinese Exclusion Act and 1892 Geary Act. In 1896, he attempted to create a new political party which could represent Chinese Americans, then corresponded with Sun Yat-sen to propose a Chinese revolutionary junta.

Wong established the first Chinese-language newspaper East of the Rockies, the Chinese American. He crusaded against vice in Chinatown, survived several assassinations attempted by gangsters and won the conviction for libel of a gangster leader. Wong brought a Chinese theater in New York, established a language school and briefly opened a Confucian temple.

In 1898, he left the United States for a family reunion in China. In Hong Kong, he applied for a United States passport, which was issued but quickly revoked on orders from the State Department in Washington. When he proceeded to Shandong, he died of heart failure in Weihai.

Activism

Civil rights
Wong founded the country's first association of Chinese American voters in 1884. Later he formed the Chinese Equal Rights League to campaign against the 1892 Geary Act, which intensified the U.S. policy of Chinese Exclusion. Wong "had clearly begun to grasp the importance of pressure politics and coalition-building." Wong organized a group of Americans with a vested interest in the Chinese goals who were unlikely to make their voices heard in Congress. The Chinese Equal Rights League sent letters to the press like the North China Herald (a newspaper for Americans in China) to push more pressure on the Congress committee. On January 26, 1893 Wong testified in front of a committee of the Congress as the president of the Chinese Equal Rights League. Wong defended Chinese Americans as law-abiding, wealthy and good mannered people. However, Wong was less successful in the give-and-take that followed with members of the committee, including Thomas J. Geary who originated the Geary Act. Despite struggling in testimony before Congress, Wong's effort had positive effect on his cause. Three months after the hearing, Secretary of the Treasury Carlisle approved modifications to the government's procedures for enforcing the Geary Act.

Cultural advocacy
Wong founded a weekly newspaper, The Chinese American, in New York City in 1883. His work was published in periodicals including the North American Review and Chautauquan. When a visitor to a saloon in New York's Chinatown accused a Chinese grocery of handling small cats and rats, Wong offered $500 reward for anyone who could prove that Chinese ate cats or rats, an offer which was not taken up. The incident provoked Wong into writing an article on Chinese food for the
Brooklyn Eagle  which offers a rich description of Chinese cooking, in which he says "chop soly", that is, Chop Suey "may justly be called the national dish of China" (though it is not the dish usually called Chop Suey in the United States).

His 1887 essay "Why Am I a Heathen?" explains his rejection of Christianity in favor of traditional Chinese beliefs; it prompted a response that same year, "Why I Am Not a Heathen", written by his fellow Chinese immigrant Yan Phou Lee, a devout Christian.

Wong went up repeatedly against anti-Chinese activist Denis Kearney, heckling him and at one point challenging him to a duel, and giving Kearney his choice of weapon: chopsticks, Irish potatoes, or Krupp guns. He was a supporter of Sun Yat-Sen's revolutionary message.

In popular culture 
There is play called Citizen Wong inspired by Wong Chin Foo.

Notes

References
Seligman, Scott D., The First Chinese American: The Remarkable Life of Wong Chin Foo (Hong Kong University Press, 2013).

 Wong Chin Foo, "Why Am I a Heathen?" North American Review 145.369 (August 1887), reprinted in Judy Yung, Gordon H. Chang, and Him Mark Lai (compilers and editors), Chinese American Voices (University of California Press (2006). ), p. 70–78.
 Yan Phou Lee, "Why I Am Not a Heathen: A Rejoinder to Wong Chin Foo" North American Review 145.370 (September 1887), reprinted in Judy Yung, Gordon H. Chang, and Him Mark Lai (compilers and editors), Chinese American Voices, University of California Press (2006). , p. 79–85/

Chinese-American history
American writers of Chinese descent
Qing dynasty emigrants to the United States
Qing dynasty journalists
1847 births
1898 deaths
19th-century American journalists
American male journalists
Writers from Qingdao
People with acquired American citizenship
Bucknell University alumni